Tau Delta Phi, whose members are commonly known as Taudelphians, is a national social fraternity founded on , in New York City. Since its inception, dozens of chapters have been founded and thousands of men initiated into its membership. Today, Tau Delta Phi fraternity operates five active chapters and colonies located primarily in the northeastern United States.

History

Founding
First established as a local fraternity, Phi Sigma Beta started at the Community Center of the Greenwich section of New York as a fraternity for Jewish men who were otherwise barred from fraternity life at that time. The founders had attended DeWitt Clinton High School. The group maintained itself as a single unit until , when it became necessary to split in into two divisions, eventually three. That same year, Gus Schieb and Leo Epstein created the Beta class at the New York School of Dentistry. Maxime Klaye, Samuel Klaye, Ben Gray and Mac Goldman created the Gamma class at New York University's School of Commerce. These "classes" became the first chapters as the founders moved into the collegiate phase of their lives.

Founders

While the initial focus was on the New York metropolitan area, by  interest from men outside of the area sparked the move to become a national organization, with the establishment of Epsilon chapter at Boston University. The decade saw a steady increase in membership. The "Pyramid" grew and expansion took its course from a regional to a national level.

By  the fraternity had grown to nineteen chapters.

In , Tau Delta Phi absorbed several chapters from Omicron Alpha Tau, a smaller Jewish fraternity with similar ideals, also active primarily in the Northeast.  These included chapters at Rutgers, NYU, and Cornell.

Recent history
The fraternity notes several "firsts": While formed to provide a fraternal experience for Jewish men, Tau Delta Phi became the first NIC fraternity to integrate by welcoming all races, creeds, ethnicities, and religions, and was the first to open membership to include transgender, gender fluid, and non-binary members. 

Ironically, the integration that Tau Delta Phi pioneered may have been a factor in chapter loss during the 's through 's. That period showed a marked contraction of chapters coinciding with the period's adoption of integration by virtually all, if not all, other national fraternities.

Since that time staff and volunteers have spearheaded a number of expansion projects, aimed to rebuild the fraternity.

Fraternity structure
The grand chapter of Tau Delta Phi Fraternity is the highest power. It convenes at every national convention and governs every aspect of the fraternity. It is composed of the executive council members, two delegates from each chartered chapter, the past living grand consuls, and one delegate from every alumni chapter in good standing.

The executive council is the board of directors of the fraternity. in between conventions, the Executive Council governs the fraternity. It is composed of all the grand officers and members of the board.

The Tau Delta Phi Management Company is a for-profit arm of the fraternity. It manages the finances of and provides support services to each House Corporation and issues a service contract for those services.

The Chapter House Corporation Each chapter should have a house corporation. House Corporations evaluate the property needs of each chapter and try to either rent, lease, or purchase a chapter house for each chapter. Each House Corporation has its own board of directors which are usually composed of fraters from their respective chapter.

The Tau Delta Phi Foundation is the nonprofit arm of the fraternity which seeks to support the educational mission of Tau Delta Phi and offer scholarships and grants to fraters of the fraternity.

The executive council
The executive council of Tau Delta Phi is the supreme legislative authority between conventions. The board is composed of all the grand officers and the members of the board. The executive council is responsible for governing the fraternity and developing strategic plans to meet educational and brotherhood outcomes.

The national office
In 2012, the executive council hired its first full-time professional executive director in three decades.  In 2014, the national office hired a graduate assistant and chapter consultant, who is able to visit chapters and colonies, and provide support for educational programs.  The national office is host to the annual leadership conference, The Pyramid Leadership Institute.

Chapters
These are the chapters of Tau Delta Phi.  Active chapters noted in bold, inactive chapters noted in italics. 

But Baird's Archive has no listing of a Tau Delta Phi chapter at Marquette, in the  article.

Notes

Notable alumni
 Len Berman, sportscaster, NBC
 Colonel Bernard Bernstein, Army financial adviser to Dwight Eisenhower
 Gilbert Cates, producer/director
 Sammy Davis Jr., entertainer
 Kinky Friedman, musician, humorist, novelist, politician
 Donald P. Greenberg, the Jacob Gould Schurman Professor of Computer Graphics at Cornell University
 Floyd Little, Pro Football Hall of Fame inductee
 Ed Orgeron, college football coach
 Irving Rapper, director
 Geraldo Rivera, broadcast journalist
 David Sarnoff, first general manager of Radio Corporation of America, Founder of NBC
 Stellan Skarsgård, actor, director
 Jerry Stiller, actor/comedian
 Dave Calloway, basketball player
 Daniel James III, Lt.Gen.U.S. Air Force, Director of Air National Guard-Pentagon

See also
List of social fraternities and sororities
List of Jewish fraternities and sororities

References

External links
Tau Delta Phi Fraternity Official Site

Student organizations established in 1910
Student societies in the United States
North American Interfraternity Conference
City College of New York
Youth organizations based in New York (state)
Historically Jewish fraternities in the United States
Organizations based in New York City
1910 establishments in New York City
Jewish organizations established in 1910